Christian Silenzi (born 24 May 1997) is an Italian footballer who plays as a midfielder for  club Seregno.

Career
Silenzi started his career in Inter, he was loaned to Reggina to the 2015–16 season, before he was signed permanently on the summer of 2016 for an undisclosed fee. He made his professional debut on 25 January 2016, in the 19th round of 2015–16 season against Lumezzane, coming on as a substitute in the 89th minute for Nicholas Siega. On January 31, 2018, fellow Serie C team Olbia signed him, but he played 14 matches here. In November 2018, newly promoted Albissola signed him. 

On 4 September 2019, he joined Cittanovese.

On 4 September 2019, he signed for Cittanova Calcio.

On 28 August 2021, he joined Serie C club Pro Vercelli.

On 21 January 2022, he transferred to Vis Pesaro.

On 28 September 2022, Silenzi joined Seregno.

Personal life 
He is the son of former footballer Andrea Silenzi.

References

Sources
 

1997 births
Living people
Sportspeople from Treviso
Footballers from Veneto
Italian footballers
Association football midfielders
Serie C players
Serie D players
Inter Milan players
A.C. Reggiana 1919 players
Reggina 1914 players
Olbia Calcio 1905 players
Albissola 2010 players
F.C. Pro Vercelli 1892 players
Vis Pesaro dal 1898 players
U.S. 1913 Seregno Calcio players